Weißig am Raschütz is a former municipality in the district of Meißen, in Saxony, Germany. With effect from 1 January 2012, it has been incorporated into the municipality of Lampertswalde.

Municipality subdivisions
Weißig am Raschütz includes the following subdivisions:
Blochwitz
Brößnitz
Oelsnitz-Niegeroda

References 

Former municipalities in Saxony
Meissen (district)